The sparganothis fruitworm moth or blueberry leafroller (Sparganothis sulfureana) is a species of moth of the family Tortricidae. It is found in most of eastern North America and on Cuba.

The wingspan is 10–20 mm. The forewings are yellow, covered with reddish-brown netlike markings. The hindwings are dirty white to pale grey. Adults are on wing from May to October in two generations per year.

The larvae feed on various forbs and woody plants, including corn and cranberry.

References

Moths described in 1860
Sparganothis